The Dhofar shrew (Crocidura dhofarensis) is a white-toothed shrew found only in the Dhofar region of Oman.

References

Crocidura
Mammals of Asia
Mammals described in 1988